Holvar-e Olya (also Romanized as Holvar-e ‘Olyā and Holver-e ‘Olyā; also known as Halbaré Olya, Holvar, and Ḩolvar-e Bālā) is a village in Seyyed Jamal ol Din Rural District, in the Central District of Asadabad County, Hamadan Province, Iran. At the 2006 census, its population was 233, in 56 families.

References 

Populated places in Asadabad County